The 1997–98 NBA season was the Pacers' 22nd season in the National Basketball Association, and 31st season as a franchise. In the off-season, the Pacers hired former Indiana State and Boston Celtics legend Larry Bird as head coach, acquired All-Star forward Chris Mullin from the Golden State Warriors, and signed free agent Mark West. Bird and Mullin were once teammates on the "Dream Team" from the 1992 Olympics in Barcelona. The Pacers struggled early in the season losing five of their first seven games, but then won 15 of their next 18 games, and held the best record in the Eastern Conference at 33–13 before the All-Star break. The Pacers won nine of their final eleven games, and returned to the playoffs after a one-year absence finishing second in the Central Division with a 58–24 record. It was also the first time since joining the NBA that the Pacers finished with a winning road record. The Pacers had the fifth best team defensive rating in the NBA.

Reggie Miller, Rik Smits and coach Bird represented the Eastern Conference during the 1998 NBA All-Star Game; it was also Smits' only All-Star appearance. Miller led the Pacers in scoring averaging 19.5 points per game, and was selected to the All-NBA Third Team, while Smits averaged 16.7 points and 6.9 rebounds per game, and Mullin provided the team with 11.3 points per game. In addition, Dale Davis provided with 8.0 points and 7.8 rebounds per game, and Mark Jackson contributed 8.3 points and 8.7 assists per game. Off the bench, sixth man Antonio Davis averaged 9.6 points and 6.8 rebounds per game, while Jalen Rose contributed 9.4 points per game, Travis Best provided with 6.5 points and 3.4 assists per game, and Derrick McKey contributed 6.3 points per game, but only played 57 games due to a ruptured Achilles tendon. Bird was named Coach of the Year after his first season as head coach.

In the playoffs, the Pacers would defeat the Cleveland Cavaliers three games to one in the Eastern Conference First Round, then defeat the 7th-seeded New York Knicks four games to one in the Eastern Conference Semi-finals. In the Eastern Conference Finals, the Pacers faced Michael Jordan, Scottie Pippen and the 2-time defending champion Chicago Bulls. However, with the series tied at 3–3, the Pacers would lose to the Bulls in a hard fought seven-game series. The Bulls would go on to defeat the Utah Jazz in six games in the NBA Finals for their third consecutive championship, and sixth overall in eight years. 

Following the season, West signed as a free agent with the Atlanta Hawks, and Haywoode Workman, who missed the entire season with a knee injury, was released to free agency and signed with the Milwaukee Bucks midway through the next season.

A notable highlight of the season was the Pacers defeating the visiting Portland Trail Blazers, 124–59 at Market Square Arena on February 27, 1998, which marked the first time in NBA history that a team scored twice as more points than its opponent. For the season, the team sported new pinstripe uniforms, which would remain in use until 2005.

Draft picks

Roster

Roster Notes
 Point guard Haywoode Workman missed the entire season due to a knee injury.

Regular season

Season standings

z - clinched division title
y - clinched division title
x - clinched playoff spot

Record vs. opponents

Game log

Regular season

|- align="center" bgcolor="#ffcccc"
| 1
| October 31, 1997
| @ New Jersey
| L 95–97
|
|
|
| Continental Airlines Arena
| 0–1

|- align="center" bgcolor="#ccffcc"
| 2
| November 1, 1997
| Golden State
| W 96–83
|
|
|
| Market Square Arena
| 1–1
|- align="center" bgcolor="#ffcccc"
| 3
| November 4, 1997
| @ Cleveland
| L 77–80
|
|
|
| Gund Arena
| 1–2
|- align="center" bgcolor="#ccffcc"
| 4
| November 5, 1997
| @ Detroit
| W 99–87
|
|
|
| The Palace of Auburn Hills
| 2–2
|- align="center" bgcolor="#ffcccc"
| 5
| November 7, 1997
| Seattle
| L 93–99
|
|
|
| Market Square Arena
| 2–3
|- align="center" bgcolor="#ffcccc"
| 6
| November 8, 1997
| @ Charlotte
| L 82–89
|
|
|
| Charlotte Coliseum
| 2–4
|- align="center" bgcolor="#ffcccc"
| 7
| November 12, 1997
| Atlanta
| L 86–89
|
|
|
| Market Square Arena
| 2–5
|- align="center" bgcolor="#ccffcc"
| 8
| November 14, 1997
| Miami
| W 82–78
|
|
|
| Market Square Arena
| 3–5
|- align="center" bgcolor="#ccffcc"
| 9
| November 15, 1997
| @ Toronto
| W 105–77
|
|
|
| SkyDome
| 4–5
|- align="center" bgcolor="#ccffcc"
| 10
| November 20, 1997
| @ Milwaukee
| W 109–83
|
|
|
| Bradley Center
| 5–5
|- align="center" bgcolor="#ffcccc"
| 11
| November 22, 1997
| Charlotte
| L 94–95
|
|
|
| Market Square Arena
| 5–6
|- align="center" bgcolor="#ccffcc"
| 12
| November 27, 1997
| Vancouver
| W 106–85
|
|
|
| Market Square Arena
| 6–6
|- align="center" bgcolor="#ccffcc"
| 13
| November 28, 1997
| Chicago
| W 94–83
|
|
|
| Market Square Arena
| 7–6
|- align="center" bgcolor="#ccffcc"
| 14
| November 30, 1997
| Philadelphia
| W 101–89
|
|
|
| Market Square Arena
| 8–6

|- align="center" bgcolor="#ccffcc"
| 15
| December 3, 1997
| @ Minnesota
| W 94–90
|
|
|
| Target Center
| 9–6
|- align="center" bgcolor="#ccffcc"
| 16
| December 5, 1997
| @ Denver
| W 96–85
|
|
|
| McNichols Sports Arena
| 10–6
|- align="center" bgcolor="#ccffcc"
| 17
| December 7, 1997
| @ Phoenix
| W 99–97 (OT)
|
|
|
| America West Arena
| 11–6
|- align="center" bgcolor="#ffcccc"
| 18
| December 8, 1997
| @ Utah
| L 97–106
|
|
|
| Delta Center
| 11–7
|- align="center" bgcolor="#ffcccc"
| 19
| December 10, 1997
| @ Portland
| L 85–93
|
|
|
| Rose Garden
| 11–8
|- align="center" bgcolor="#ccffcc"
| 20
| December 12, 1997
| Miami
| W 104–89
|
|
|
| Market Square Arena
| 12–8
|- align="center" bgcolor="#ccffcc"
| 21
| December 13, 1997
| Washington
| W 109–92
|
|
|
| Market Square Arena
| 13–8
|- align="center" bgcolor="#ccffcc"
| 22
| December 15, 1997
| @ Toronto
| W 108–101
|
|
|
| SkyDome
| 14–8
|- align="center" bgcolor="#ccffcc"
| 23
| December 17, 1997
| New York
| W 87–80
|
|
|
| Market Square Arena
| 15–8
|- align="center" bgcolor="#ccffcc"
| 24
| December 19, 1997
| Detroit
| W 98–90
|
|
|
| Market Square Arena
| 16–8
|- align="center" bgcolor="#ccffcc"
| 25
| December 20, 1997
| @ Orlando
| W 95–92
|
|
|
| Orlando Arena
| 17–8
|- align="center" bgcolor="#ffcccc"
| 26
| December 23, 1997
| @ San Antonio
| L 79–91
|
|
|
| Alamodome
| 17–9
|- align="center" bgcolor="#ccffcc"
| 27
| December 26, 1997
| Orlando
| W 107–81
|
|
|
| Market Square Arena
| 18–9
|- align="center" bgcolor="#ffcccc"
| 28
| December 28, 1997
| @ Miami
| L 90–101
|
|
|
| Miami Arena
| 18–10
|- align="center" bgcolor="#ccffcc"
| 29
| December 30, 1997
| New Jersey
| W 109–91
|
|
|
| Market Square Arena
| 19–10

|- align="center" bgcolor="#ccffcc"
| 30
| January 2, 1998
| @ Washington
| W 99–81
|
|
|
| MCI Center
| 20–10
|- align="center" bgcolor="#ccffcc"
| 31
| January 3, 1998
| Toronto
| W 89–77
|
|
|
| Market Square Arena
| 21–10
|- align="center" bgcolor="#ffcccc"
| 32
| January 6, 1998
| Phoenix
| L 80–81
|
|
|
| Market Square Arena
| 21–11
|- align="center" bgcolor="#ccffcc"
| 33
| January 8, 1998
| @ Houston
| W 87–80
|
|
|
| Compaq Center
| 22–11
|- align="center" bgcolor="#ccffcc"
| 34
| January 10, 1998
| @ Dallas
| W 84–79
|
|
|
| Reunion Arena
| 23–11
|- align="center" bgcolor="#ccffcc"
| 35
| January 14, 1998
| Detroit
| W 100–93
|
|
|
| Market Square Arena
| 24–11
|- align="center" bgcolor="#ccffcc"
| 36
| January 16, 1998
| Sacramento
| W 117–92
|
|
|
| Market Square Arena
| 25–11
|- align="center" bgcolor="#ccffcc"
| 37
| January 18, 1998
| @ Boston
| W 103–96
|
|
|
| FleetCenter
| 26–11
|- align="center" bgcolor="#ffcccc"
| 38
| January 21, 1998
| @ New York
| L 89–97
|
|
|
| Madison Square Garden
| 26–12
|- align="center" bgcolor="#ccffcc"
| 39
| January 23, 1998
| Utah
| W 106–102
|
|
|
| Market Square Arena
| 27–12
|- align="center" bgcolor="#ccffcc"
| 40
| January 24, 1998
| Boston
| W 95–88
|
|
|
| Market Square Arena
| 28–12
|- align="center" bgcolor="#ccffcc"
| 41
| January 27, 1998
| Washington
| W 85–84
|
|
|
| Market Square Arena
| 29–12
|- align="center" bgcolor="#ccffcc"
| 42
| January 28, 1998
| @ Philadelphia
| W 93–90 (OT)
|
|
|
| CoreStates Center
| 30–12
|- align="center" bgcolor="#ccffcc"
| 43
| January 30, 1998
| Cleveland
| W 89–83
|
|
|
| Market Square Arena
| 31–12

|- align="center" bgcolor="#ccffcc"
| 44
| February 1, 1998
| @ L.A. Clippers
| W 99–92
|
|
|
| Los Angeles Memorial Sports Arena
| 32–12
|- align="center" bgcolor="#ccffcc"
| 45
| February 3, 1998
| @ Sacramento
| W 115–93
|
|
|
| ARCO Arena
| 33–12
|- align="center" bgcolor="#ffcccc"
| 46
| February 4, 1998
| @ Seattle
| L 97–104
|
|
|
| KeyArena
| 33–13
|- align="center"
|colspan="9" bgcolor="#bbcaff"|All-Star Break
|- style="background:#cfc;"
|- bgcolor="#bbffbb"
|- align="center" bgcolor="#ccffcc"
| 47
| February 10, 1998
| Orlando
| W 85–66
|
|
|
| Market Square Arena
| 34–13
|- align="center" bgcolor="#ccffcc"
| 48
| February 11, 1998
| @ Miami
| W 110–101
|
|
|
| Miami Arena
| 35–13
|- align="center" bgcolor="#ffcccc"
| 49
| February 13, 1998
| Dallas
| L 82–85 (2OT)
|
|
|
| Market Square Arena
| 35–14
|- align="center" bgcolor="#ccffcc"
| 50
| February 14, 1998
| @ Atlanta
| W 96–92
|
|
|
| Georgia Dome
| 36–14
|- align="center" bgcolor="#ffcccc"
| 51
| February 17, 1998
| @ Chicago
| L 97–105
|
|
|
| United Center
| 36–15
|- align="center" bgcolor="#ccffcc"
| 52
| February 19, 1998
| Philadelphia
| W 82–77
|
|
|
| Market Square Arena
| 37–15
|- align="center" bgcolor="#ffcccc"
| 53
| February 20, 1998
| @ Orlando
| L 91–93
|
|
|
| Orlando Arena
| 37–16
|- align="center" bgcolor="#ccffcc"
| 54
| February 22, 1998
| @ Philadelphia
| W 97–92
|
|
|
| CoreStates Center
| 38–16
|- align="center" bgcolor="#ffcccc"
| 55
| February 25, 1998
| L.A. Lakers
| L 89–96
|
|
|
| Market Square Arena
| 38–17
|- align="center" bgcolor="#ccffcc"
| 56
| February 27, 1998
| Portland
| W 124–59
|
|
|
| Market Square Arena
| 39–17

|- align="center" bgcolor="#ccffcc"
| 57
| March 1, 1998
| Denver
| W 90–63
|
|
|
| Market Square Arena
| 40–17
|- align="center" bgcolor="#ccffcc"
| 58
| March 3, 1998
| @ Vancouver
| W 111–103
|
|
|
| General Motors Place
| 41–17
|- align="center" bgcolor="#ffcccc"
| 59
| March 4, 1998
| @ L.A. Lakers
| L 95–104
|
|
|
| Great Western Forum
| 41–18
|- align="center" bgcolor="#ccffcc"
| 60
| March 6, 1998
| @ Golden State
| W 101–87
|
|
|
| The Arena in Oakland
| 42–18
|- align="center" bgcolor="#ccffcc"
| 61
| March 8, 1998
| Boston
| W 104–100
|
|
|
| Market Square Arena
| 43–18
|- align="center" bgcolor="#ffcccc"
| 62
| March 11, 1998
| @ Detroit
| L 91–122
|
|
|
| The Palace of Auburn Hills
| 43–19
|- align="center" bgcolor="#ccffcc"
| 63
| March 13, 1998
| Milwaukee
| W 96–76
|
|
|
| Market Square Arena
| 44–19
|- align="center" bgcolor="#ccffcc"
| 64
| March 15, 1998
| @ New York
| W 91–86
|
|
|
| Madison Square Garden
| 45–19
|- align="center" bgcolor="#ffcccc"
| 65
| March 17, 1998
| Chicago
| L 84–90
|
|
|
| Market Square Arena
| 45–20
|- align="center" bgcolor="#ccffcc"
| 66
| March 19, 1998
| @ Washington
| W 95–91
|
|
|
| MCI Center
| 46–20
|- align="center" bgcolor="#ccffcc"
| 67
| March 20, 1998
| New Jersey
| W 99–92
|
|
|
| Market Square Arena
| 47–20
|- align="center" bgcolor="#ccffcc"
| 68
| March 22, 1998
| @ Milwaukee
| W 96–94 (OT)
|
|
|
| Bradley Center
| 48–20
|- align="center" bgcolor="#ffcccc"
| 69
| March 25, 1998
| Houston
| L 81–86
|
|
|
| Market Square Arena
| 48–21
|- align="center" bgcolor="#ccffcc"
| 70
| March 27, 1998
| Charlotte
| W 133–96
|
|
|
| Market Square Arena
| 49–21
|- align="center" bgcolor="#ffcccc"
| 71
| March 29, 1998
| San Antonio
| L 55–74
|
|
|
| Market Square Arena
| 49–22
|- align="center" bgcolor="#ccffcc"
| 72
| March 31, 1998
| L.A. Clippers
| W 128–106
|
|
|
| Market Square Arena
| 50–22

|- align="center" bgcolor="#ccffcc"
| 73
| April 2, 1998
| Minnesota
| W 111–108
|
|
|
| Market Square Arena
| 51–22
|- align="center" bgcolor="#ffcccc"
| 74
| April 3, 1998
| @ Charlotte
| L 89–96
|
|
|
| Charlotte Coliseum
| 51–23
|- align="center" bgcolor="#ccffcc"
| 75
| April 5, 1998
| Milwaukee
| W 93–92
|
|
|
| Market Square Arena
| 52–23
|- align="center" bgcolor="#ccffcc"
| 76
| April 7, 1998
| Cleveland
| W 82–80
|
|
|
| Market Square Arena
| 53–23
|- align="center" bgcolor="#ccffcc"
| 77
| April 9, 1998
| @ Atlanta
| W 105–102 (OT)
|
|
|
| Georgia Dome
| 54–23
|- align="center" bgcolor="#ccffcc"
| 78
| April 12, 1998
| @ Boston
| W 93–87
|
|
|
| FleetCenter
| 55–23
|- align="center" bgcolor="#ccffcc"
| 79
| April 13, 1998
| @ Chicago
| W 114–105
|
|
|
| United Center
| 56–23
|- align="center" bgcolor="#ccffcc"
| 80
| April 15, 1998
| Atlanta
| W 82–70
|
|
|
| Market Square Arena
| 57–23
|- align="center" bgcolor="#ccffcc"
| 81
| April 17, 1998
| Toronto
| W 107–98
|
|
|
| Market Square Arena
| 58–23
|- align="center" bgcolor="#ffcccc"
| 82
| April 18, 1998
| @ Cleveland
| L 92–96
|
|
|
| Gund Arena
| 58–24

Playoffs

|- align="center" bgcolor="#ccffcc"
| 1
| April 23, 1998
| Cleveland
| W 106–77
| Mullin (20)
| Mullin (6)
| Jackson (10)
| Market Square Arena16,644
| 1–0
|- align="center" bgcolor="#ccffcc"
| 2
| April 25, 1998
| Cleveland
| W 92–86
| Miller (18)
| D. Davis (10)
| Jackson (11)
| Market Square Arena16,617
| 2–0
|- align="center" bgcolor="#ffcccc"
| 3
| April 27, 1998
| @ Cleveland
| L 77–86
| Smits (26)
| D. Davis (9)
| Jackson (17)
| Gund Arena17,495
| 2–1
|- align="center" bgcolor="#ccffcc"
| 4
| April 30, 1998
| @ Cleveland
| W 80–74
| Miller (19)
| A. Davis (9)
| Jackson (6)
| Gund Arena18,188
| 3–1
|-

|- align="center" bgcolor="#ccffcc"
| 1
| May 5, 1998
| New York
| W 93–83
| Miller (17)
| D. Davis (11)
| Jackson (6)
| Market Square Arena16,630
| 1–0
|- align="center" bgcolor="#ccffcc"
| 2
| May 7, 1998
| New York
| W 85–77
| Smits (22)
| D. Davis (9)
| Jackson (5)
| Market Square Arena16,765
| 2–0
|- align="center" bgcolor="#ffcccc"
| 3
| May 9, 1998
| @ New York
| L 76–83
| Miller (23)
| D. Davis (9)
| Jackson (9)
| Madison Square Garden19,763
| 2–1
|- align="center" bgcolor="#ccffcc"
| 4
| May 10, 1998
| @ New York
| W 118–107 (OT)
| Miller (38)
| A. Davis (9)
| Jackson (15)
| Madison Square Garden19,763
| 3–1
|- align="center" bgcolor="#ccffcc"
| 5
| May 13, 1998
| New York
| W 99–88
| Miller (24)
| Jackson (14)
| Jackson (13)
| Market Square Arena16,767
| 4–1
|-

|- align="center" bgcolor="#ffcccc"
| 1
| May 17, 1998
| @ Chicago
| L 79–85
| Miller (16)
| A. Davis (11)
| Jackson (6)
| United Center23,844
| 0–1
|- align="center" bgcolor="#ffcccc"
| 2
| May 19, 1998
| @ Chicago
| L 98–104
| Miller (19)
| D. Davis (9)
| Jackson (8)
| United Center23,844
| 0–2
|- align="center" bgcolor="#ccffcc"
| 3
| May 23, 1998
| Chicago
| W 107–105
| Miller (28)
| A. Davis (12)
| Jackson,Rose (6)
| Market Square Arena16,576
| 1–2
|- align="center" bgcolor="#ccffcc"
| 4
| May 25, 1998
| Chicago
| W 96–94
| Smits (26)
| Mullin (9)
| Jackson (7)
| Market Square Arena16,560
| 2–2
|- align="center" bgcolor="#ffcccc"
| 5
| May 27, 1998
| @ Chicago
| L 87–106
| Miller (14)
| A. Davis,Smits (7)
| Jackson (5)
| United Center23,844
| 2–3
|- align="center" bgcolor="#ccffcc"
| 6
| May 29, 1998
| Chicago
| W 92–89
| Smits (25)
| D. Davis (8)
| Best,A. Davis,Jackson (3)
| Market Square Arena16,566
| 3–3
|- align="center" bgcolor="#ffcccc"
| 7
| May 31, 1998
| @ Chicago
| L 83–88
| Miller (22)
| A. Davis (10)
| Jackson (6)
| United Center23,844
| 3–4
|-

Player stats

Season

Playoffs

Awards
 Larry Bird, NBA Coach of the Year Award
 Larry Bird, All-Star East Head Coach
 Reggie Miller, NBA All-Star Game
 Rik Smits, NBA All-Star Game
 Reggie Miller, All-NBA Third Team

Transactions

See also
 1997–98 NBA season

References

Indiana Pacers seasons
Pace
Pace
Indiana